John Howard Neal (18 October 1926 – 18 April 2012) was an English cricketer. Neal was a right-handed batsman who fielded as a wicket-keeper. He was born at Ditchling, Sussex and educated at Hurstpierpoint College.

Neal made his debut for Sussex in the 1950 Minor Counties Championship against Essex. Neal played a further two Minor Counties Championship matches from 1950 to 1951. Neal made a single first-class appearance for Sussex against Lancashire at Old Trafford in 1951. In Sussex's first-innings, he scored 5 runs before being dismissed by Malcolm Hilton. In their second-innings, he was dismissed for 23 runs by Alan Wharton. This was his only major appearance for Sussex.

Neal died in hospital on 18 April 2012 after a short illness.

References

External links
John Neal at ESPNcricinfo
John Neal at CricketArchive

1926 births
2012 deaths
English cricketers
People educated at Hurstpierpoint College
People from Ditchling
Sussex cricketers
Wicket-keepers